Problepsis superans is a moth of the  family Geometridae. It is found in Japan, Taiwan, Russia and China.

The wingspan is 47–50 mm.

Subspecies
Problepsis superans superans (Japan)
Problepsis superans summa Prout, 1935 (China)

References

Moths described in 1885
Scopulini
Moths of Asia